Loma is a genus of microsporidian parasites, infecting fish. The taxonomic position of Loma in the family Glugeidae has been questioned by DNA sequencing results.

Species include

 Loma acerinae - formerly placed in Glugea
 Loma branchialis - the type species
 Loma camerounensis - a parasite of the cichlid fish, Oreochromis niloticus
 Loma dimorpha
 Loma morhua
 Loma myriophis - parasite of the ophichthid fish, Myrophis platyrhynchus
 Loma salmonae - a parasite of Pacific salmon, Oncorhynchus spp.
 Loma trichiuri - a parasite of a marine trichiurid fish, Trichiurus savala''

References

Microsporidia genera
Parasites of fish